Richard Bakalyan (January 29, 1931 – February 27, 2015) was an American actor who started his career playing juvenile delinquents in his first several films.

Early life
Richard Bakalyan was born on January 29, 1931, in Watertown, Massachusetts, the son of Armenian-born William Nishan Bakalyan and  Elsie Florence (née Fancy) Bakalyan, a Canadian from Nova Scotia. He had two brothers. His father died in 1939, when Richard was 8.

Growing up in a tough neighborhood, Bakalyan learned boxing to defend himself in street fights. He served a year's probation at age 15 for unknown crimes.

Bakalyan served in the United States Air Force during the Korean War. After four years of service, he was honorably discharged with the rank of staff sergeant.

Career

Film
Early in his career he was cast as thugs, outlaws, and in military action films, like The Delinquents (1957), The Bonnie Parker Story (1958), and Up Periscope (1959). During the filming of 1958's juvenile-gang drama The Cool and the Crazy, he and fellow actor Dick Jones were arrested for vagrancy for real on-location in Kansas City. They were standing on the corner between takes in "JD" outfits and the police thought that they were actual gang members. It took several hours for the film crew to explain to the police what was going on and get them released from jail.

By the mid-1960s, as he grew out of these roles, he became something of a comic heavy, often cast in family Disney films though still known in dramas. Some of his Disney projects included Never a Dull Moment (1968), The Computer Wore Tennis Shoes (1969), The Strongest Man in the World (1975), Return from Witch Mountain (1978), and voice-efforts in The Fox and the Hound (1981), as 'Dinky' the finch bird.

Bakalyan had an uncredited role in The Greatest Story Ever Told (1965) as the good thief on the cross. He appeared in several of Frank Sinatra's movies during the 1960s, such as Robin and the 7 Hoods (1964), None but the Brave (1965), and Von Ryan's Express (1965), becoming lifelong friends with the Sinatra family. While filming Pressure Point in 1962, he met co-star Bobby Darin, who later became one of Bakalyan's closest friends. It's reported Bakalyan was one of the last friends to see Darin, before his early death from heart disease, in 1973. Bakalyan played Detective Loach in Roman Polanski's 1974 film Chinatown opposite Jack Nicholson and Faye Dunaway.

Television

Bakalyan has also appeared on numerous television shows from the 1950s through the 2000s. Early small screen performances came in Panic!, The Life and Legend of Wyatt Earp, The Many Loves of Dobie Gillis, Hawaiian Eye and The Untouchables. In 1966, he played Sgt. Piper on the World War II drama Combat! in the 4th season episode" Gitty". Later he appeared in a variety of shows, including Batman, Ellery Queen, Mannix, Love, American Style, Kojak, The Bionic Woman, Charlie's Angels, Hill Street Blues, Emergency! (1977 S6-E15), where he starred as Charley a fire apparatus mechanic, and the NBC comedy series My Name Is Earl, which was his last screen effort in October 2008.

In 1968, Bakalyan was featured in "Way Down Cellar," a two-part story on Walt Disney's Wonderful World of Color. He was a regular on Dean Martin Presents: The Bobby Darin Amusement Company (1972) and The Bobby Darin Show (1973).

Personal life
Bakalyan was married to Elizabeth Baumann from 1952 until her death in 1967.

A prolific character actor, Bakalyan was profiled in the book Names You Never Remember, With Faces You Never Forget by Justin Humphreys.

Death
Bakalyan died suddenly of a stroke on February 27, 2015, at the Arnot Ogden Medical Center, in Elmira, New York, aged 84.

Filmography

Film

Television

References

Further reading

External links

 
 
 

1931 births
2015 deaths
20th-century American male actors
People from Watertown, Massachusetts
American male film actors
American male television actors
American male voice actors
American male comedians
American people of Armenian descent
American people of Canadian descent
United States Air Force personnel of the Korean War
Burials at Forest Lawn Memorial Park (Hollywood Hills)
Male actors from Boston
United States Air Force airmen
20th-century American comedians